James Henry Hughes (born 1911, date of death unknown) was an English footballer who played as a centre-half in the Football League for Bristol City.

Hughes was born in Cuddington and played for Northwich ICI before moving to Birmingham in 1933. He spent a season with the club, without making a League appearance. He signed for Bristol City on 8 May 1934 and made ten League appearances in his single season there.

References

1911 births
Date of birth missing
Year of death missing
People from Cuddington, Eddisbury
Footballers from Cheshire
English footballers
Association football central defenders
Birmingham City F.C. players
Bristol City F.C. players
English Football League players